Oti Kandi (آتی‌کندی, also Romanized as Otī Kandī; also known as Owtū Kandī) is a village in Seyyedan Rural District of Abish Ahmad District, Kaleybar County, East Azerbaijan province, Iran. At the 2006 National Census, its population was 1,047 in 207 households. The following census in 2011 counted 838 people in 225 households. The latest census in 2016 showed a population of 791 people in 228 households; it was the largest village in its rural district.

References 

Kaleybar County

Populated places in East Azerbaijan Province

Populated places in Kaleybar County